The Egyptian Basketball Federation  is the governing body of the sport of basketball in Egypt. It joined International Basketball Federation FIBA in 1934.

History
It was founded in 1934, and was a member of FIBA Europe, as the FIBA Africa zone was not founded until 1961.

Offices
The Egyptian Basketball Federation offices are located in Cairo.

Men's teams
The Egyptian Basketball Federation originally focused on the men's Egyptian national basketball team, with their achievements including 9th place at the 1952 Summer Olympics, as well as its 5th place at the 1950 FIBA World Championship.  At the FIBA Africa Championships, Egypt holds a records number of 16 medals. Egypt's men's team participated in the Summer Olympic Games seven times. In 1984 and 1988, Egypt came in the 12th on both occasions.

Women's team
The Egyptian women's national basketball team won the FIBA Africa Championship for Women in 1966 and 1968, and came second in 1970, as the United Arab Republic.

See also
Egyptian Basketball Premier League

References

External links
Official website

Egypt
Basketball
Basketball in Egypt
Sports organizations established in 1934